The 391st Fighter Squadron is part of the 366th Fighter Wing at Mountain Home Air Force Base, Idaho. The squadron participated in combat missions in World War II and the Vietnam War, provided air defense in Korea and Japan from 1968 to 1971, and continues to provide tactical air command for the United States Air Force. It currently operates McDonnell Douglas F-15E Strike Eagle aircraft, conducting close air support missions.

Mission
Perform close air support, interdiction, strategic attack, suppression of enemy air defense, and defensive counterair missions, employing the full array of U.S. Air Force capabilities including precision-guided munitions, inertially-aided munitions, night vision goggles, fighter data link, and Low Altitude Navigation and Targeting Infrared for Night (LANTIRN).

History

World War II
The 391st flew combat missions in the European Theater of Operations from 14 March 1944 to 3 May 1945.

Tactical Air Command

Vietnam War
The squadron flew in combat in Southeast Asia from 2 February 1966 to 21 July 1968.

Pacific air defense
It provided air defense in Korea and Japan from 22 July 1968 to 14 February 1971.

2013 sequestration

Air Combat Command officials announced a stand down and reallocation of flying hours for the rest of the fiscal year 2013 due to mandatory budget cuts.   The across-the-board spending cuts, called sequestration, took effect 1 March when Congress failed to agree on a deficit-reduction plan.

Squadrons either stood down on a rotating basis or kept combat ready or at a reduced readiness level called "basic mission capable" for part or all of the remaining months in fiscal 2013. This affected the 391st Fighter Squadron with a stand-down grounding from 9 April-30 September 2013.

Lineage
 Constituted as the 391st Fighter Squadron (Single-Engine) on 24 May 1943
 Activated on 1 June 1943
 Redesignated 391st Fighter Squadron, Single-Engine on 20 August 1943
 Inactivated on 20 August 1946
 Redesignated 391st Fighter-Bomber Squadron on 15 November 1952
 Activated on 1 January 1953
 Redesignated 391st Tactical Fighter Squadron on 1 July 1958
 Inactivated on 1 April 1959
 Activated on 30 April 1962 (not organized)
 Organized on 8 May 1962
 Inactivated on 28 February 1971
 Activated on 1 July 1971
 Inactivated on 1 July 1990
 Redesignated 391st Fighter Squadron on 1 March 1992
 Activated on 11 March 1992

Assignments
 366th Fighter Group: 1 June 1943 – 20 August 1946
 366th Fighter-Bomber Group: 1 January 1953 (attached to 21st Fighter-Bomber Wing 6 December 1956 – 11 June 1957)
 366th Fighter-Bomber Wing (later 366th Tactical Fighter Wing): 25 September 1957 – 1 April 1959
 United States Air Forces in Europe: 30 April 1962 (not organized)
 366th Tactical Fighter Wing: 8 May 1962
 2d Air Division, 26 January 1966 (attached to 12th Tactical Fighter Wing)
 Seventh Air Force, 1 April 1966 (remained attached to 12 Tactical Fighter Wing)
 12th Tactical Fighter Wing, 23 June 1966
 475th Tactical Fighter Wing, 22 July 1968 – 28 February 1971
 347th Tactical Fighter Wing, 1 July 1972
 366th Tactical Fighter Wing (later 366th Fighter Wing: 31 October 1972 – 1 July 1990
 366th Operations Group, 11 March 1992 – present

Stations

 Richmond Army Air Base, Virginia, 1 June 1943
 Bluethenthal Field, North Carolina, 9 August 1943
 Richmond Army Air Base, Virginia, 6 November 1943 – 17 December 1943
 RAF Membury, England, 12 January 1944
 RAF Thruxton, England, 1 March 1944
 Saint-Pierre-du-Mont Airfield, France, 20 June 1944
 Dreux - Vernouillet Airport, France, 24 August 1944
 Laon-Couvron Air Base, France, 7 September 1944
 Asch Airfield, Belgium, 26 November 1944
 Münster-Handorf Airfield, Germany, 21 April 1945
 Bayreuth-Bindlach Airfield, Germany, c. 25 June 1945
 Fritzlar Air Base, Germany, 11 September 1945 – 20 August 1946
 Alexandria Air Force Base (later England Air Force Base), Louisiana, 1 January 1953 – 1 April 1959
 Deployed to Aviano Air Base, Italy, 6 December 1956 – 11 June 1957
 Etain-Rouvres Air Base, France, 30 April 1962
 Holloman Air Force Base, New Mexico, 12 June 1963
 Cam Ranh Air Base, South Vietnam, 29 January 1966
 Misawa Air Base, Japan, 22 July 1968 – 28 February1971
 Deployed to:
 Taegu Air Base, South Korea, 22 July–7 October 1968, 7 February–5 March 1969, 1 May–2 June 1969, 1–30 August 1969, 1–15 February 1970, 15–29 March 1970)
 Kunsan Air Base, South Korea, 26 April–10 May 1970, 7–21 June 1970, 30 August–12 September 1970, 4–18 October 1970, 1–15 November 1970, 13–19 December 1970, 1–15 February 1971)
 Mountain Home Air Force Base, Idaho, 1 July 1971 – 1 July 1990
 Mountain Home Air Force Base, Idaho, 11March 1992 – present

Aircraft

 Republic P-47 Thunderbolt (1943–1946)
 North American P-51 Mustang (1953)
 North American F-86 Sabre (1953–1955)
 Republic F-84 Thunderjet (1954–1958)
 Republic F-84F Thunderstreak (1962–1965)
 North American F-100 Super Sabre (1957–1959)
 McDonnell F-4 Phantom II (1965–1971)
 General Dynamics F-111 Aardvark (1971–1990)
 McDonnell Douglas F-15E Strike Eagle (1992–present)

References

Notes

Citations

Bibliography

 
 
 

391
Military units and formations established in 1943
Military units and formations in Idaho
Fighter squadrons of the United States Army Air Forces